STS-71 was the third mission of the US/Russian Shuttle-Mir Program and the first Space Shuttle docking to Russian space station Mir. It started on June 27, 1995, with the launch of Space Shuttle Atlantis from launchpad 39A at the Kennedy Space Center in Florida. The Shuttle delivered a relief crew of two cosmonauts Anatoly Solovyev and Nikolai Budarin to the station and recovered Increment astronaut Norman Thagard. Atlantis returned to Earth on July 7 with a crew of eight. It was the first of seven straight missions to Mir flown by Atlantis, and the second Shuttle mission to land with an eight-person crew after STS-61-A in 1985.

For the five days the Shuttle was docked to Mir they were the largest spacecraft in orbit at the time. STS-71 marked the first docking of a Space Shuttle to a space station, the first time a Shuttle crew switched members with the crew of a station, and the 100th crewed space launch by the United States. The mission carried Spacelab and included a logistical resupply of Mir. Together the Shuttle and station crews conducted various on-orbit joint US/Russian life science investigations with Spacelab along with the Shuttle Amateur Radio Experiment-II (SAREX-II) experiment.

Crew

Mission highlights

The primary objectives of this flight were to rendezvous and perform the first docking between the Space Shuttle and the Russian Space Station Mir on June 29. In the first U.S.-Russian(Soviet) docking in twenty years, Atlantis delivered a relief crew of two cosmonauts Anatoly Solovyev and Nikolai Budarin to Mir.

Other prime objectives were on-orbit joint United States of America-Russian life sciences investigations aboard SPACELAB/Mir, logistical resupply of the Mir and recovery of US astronaut Norman E. Thagard.

Secondary objectives included filming with the IMAX camera and the Shuttle Amateur Radio Experiment-II (SAREX-II) experiment.

STS-71 was the 100th U.S. human space launch conducted from Cape Canaveral, the first U.S. Space Shuttle-Russian Space Station docking and joint on-orbit operations; largest spacecraft ever in orbit; and the first on-orbit changeout of Shuttle crew.

The rendezvous sequence began at 15:32:19 EDT with a lift-off in-plane with Mir's orbit, at the opening of the 10 minute 19 second launch window. Ascent was nominal with no OMS 1 burn required. The OMS 2 burn, initiated at 42 minutes 58 seconds Mission Elapsed Time, adjusted the orbit to 160 x 85.3 nautical miles. It was the lowest ever perigee altitude flown by an orbiter. This facilitated a very rapid initial catch up rate with Mir of about 880 nautical miles per orbit. Almost three hours later the orbit was raised to more typical values of 210 x 159 nautical miles by the OMS 3 burn.

Docking occurred at 9 am EDT, June 29, using R-Bar or Earth radius vector approach, with Atlantis closing in on Mir from directly below. R-bar approach allows natural forces to brake the orbiter's approach more than would occur along standard approach directly in front of the space station; also, an R-bar approach minimizes the number of orbiter jet firings needed for approach. The manual phase of the docking began with Atlantis about a half-mile (800 m) below Mir, with Gibson at the controls on aft flight deck. Closing rate was close to the targeted 0.1 foot per second (30 mm/s), being approximately 0.107 foot per second (33 mm/s) at contact. Interface contact was nearly flawless: less than  lateral misalignment and an angular misalignment of less than 0.5 degrees per axis. No braking jet firings had been required. Docking occurred about 216 nautical miles above Lake Baikal region of the Russian Federation. The Orbiter Docking System (ODS) with Androgynous Peripheral Docking System served as the actual connection point to a similar interface on the docking port on Mir's Kristall module. ODS, located in the forward payload bay of Atlantis, performed flawlessly during the docking sequence.

When linked, Atlantis and Mir formed the largest spacecraft ever in orbit, with a total mass of about 225 metric tons (almost one-half million pounds), orbiting some 218 nautical miles above the Earth. After hatches on each side opened, STS-71 crew passed into Mir for a welcoming ceremony. On the same day, the Mir 18 crew officially transferred responsibility for the station to the Mir 19 crew, and the two crews switched spacecraft.

For the next five days, about 100 hours in total, joint U.S.-Russian operations were conducted, including biomedical investigations, and transfer of equipment to and from Mir. Fifteen separate biomedical and scientific investigations were conducted, using the Spacelab module installed in the aft portion of Atlantiss payload bay, and covering seven different disciplines: cardiovascular and pulmonary functions; human metabolism; neuroscience; hygiene, sanitation and radiation; behavioral performance and biology; fundamental biology; and microgravity research. The Mir 18 crew served as test subjects for investigations. Three Mir 18 crew members also carried out an intensive programme of exercise and other measures to prepare for re-entry into gravity environment after more than three months in space.

Numerous medical samples as well as disks and cassettes were transferred to Atlantis from Mir, including more than 100 urine and saliva samples, about 30 blood samples, 20 surface samples, 12 air samples, several water samples and numerous breath samples taken from Mir 18 crew members. Also moved was a broken Salyut-5 computer.

The spacecraft undocked on July 4, following a farewell ceremony, with the Mir hatch closing at 3:32 pm EDT. July 3 and hatch on Orbiter Docking System shut 16 minutes later. Gibson compared separation sequence to a "cosmic" ballet: Prior to the Mir-Atlantis undocking, the Mir 19 crew temporarily abandoned station, flying away from it in their Soyuz spacecraft so they could record images of Atlantis and Mir separating. Soyuz unlatched at 6:55 am EDT, and Gibson undocked Atlantis from Mir at 7:10 am EDT. Whilst both spacecraft were undocked from Mir, the station suffered a computer malfunction and started to drift in attitude. The Mir 19 crew performed a hasty re-docking, monitored by Atlantis. They subsequently replaced computer hardware allowing them to regain attitude control.

The returning crew of eight equaled the largest crew (STS-61-A, October 1985) in Shuttle history. To ease their re-entry into gravity environment after more than 100 days in space, Mir 18 crew members Thagard, Dezhurov and Strekalov lay supine in custom-made recumbent seats installed prior to landing in the orbiter middeck.

Inflight problems included a glitch with General Purpose Computer 4 (GPC 4), which was declared failed when it did not synchronize with GPC 1; subsequent troubleshooting indicated it was an isolated event, and GPC 4 operated satisfactorily for the remainder of mission.

During the SAREX portion of the flight, the crew contacted several schools. One was Redlands High School in Redlands, California. Charlie Precourt was able to contact students, former students and technicians that built the communications package. A cross polarized, dual band yagi antenna array and automatic rotor was installed on the roof of the electronics classroom. A dual band radio was installed inside the radio room of the classroom. The contact window lasted about 10 minutes, during which time, about twelve people were able to ask questions. While most were basic or technical questions, one was peculiar. "What would happen of you sneezed inside your helmet?"  Precourt answered that you'd probably, "spray your face shield a little bit.." and carry on.

See also

 List of human spaceflights
 List of human spaceflights to Mir
 List of Space Shuttle missions
 Outline of space science
 United States Astronaut Hall of Fame#Exhibits

References

External links
 STS-71 Video Highlights 

Space Shuttle missions
Spacecraft launched in 1995